Katty Fuentes García (born c. 1976) is a Mexican woman from the state of Nuevo León, who won the national beauty pageant of Mexico and represented her country in the Miss Universe 1998 pageant, held in Honolulu, Hawaii, U.S. on May 12, 1998. There, she received the Clairol Style Award and the third placement in the National Costume Competition.

References

1970s births
Beauty pageant contestants from Monterrey
Living people
Miss Universe 1998 contestants
Nuestra Belleza México winners